The 2021–22 season was Maccabi Haifa's 64th season in Israeli Premier League, and their 40th consecutive season in the top division of Israeli football.

In this season, the team won its Second championship in a consecutive to achieve three from four title  on this season (Israeli Premier League, Toto Cup and the israeli super cup) and Finished Runners-up on the Israeli state cup.

Club

Squad information

Transfers

In

Out

Pre-season and friendlies

Competitions

Overview

including 3-0 Walkover win against Bnei Sakhnin in round 35

Ligat Ha'Al

Regular season

Regular season table

Matches

Results overview

Championship round

Championship round table

Matches

Results overview

Overall

Results summary

Results by round

State Cup

Toto Cup

Semi-final

Final

Israel Super Cup

UEFA Champions League

First qualifying round

UEFA Europa Conference League

Qualifying phase

Second qualifying round

Third qualifying round

Play-off round

Group stage

Statistics

Squad statistics

Goals

Clean sheets

Disciplinary record for Ligat Ha'Al and State Cup

Disciplinary record for Champions League and Europa Conference League

Suspensions

Penalties

Overall

Notes

References

External links
 Maccabi Haifa website

Maccabi Haifa F.C. seasons
Maccabi Haifa
2021–22 UEFA Europa Conference League participants seasons